Wael Ismael "Zenga" (born 25 November 1981) is an Egyptian football coach. He has previously played as a goalkeeper for Egyptian Premier League clubs Zamalek, Aluminium Nag Hammadi, Ghazl El Mahalla, and El Dakhleya.

He has won three titles on a national scale. He won a bronze medal in the 2001 FIFA World Youth Championship. He achieved the African Youth Cup of Nations third place in 2001. He was a Bronze Medalist at the Francophone Games with the Egyptian Olympic Team.

Honors

with Zamalek
3 back-to-back league titles from 2000–2004,
1 Egyptian Cup,
2 Egyptian Super Cups,
1 African Cup Winners Cup,
1 Arab Champions Cup,
1 African Champions League,
1 African Super Cup,
1 Saudi-Egyptian Super Cup.

References

External links
Profile at Egyptianfootball.net

Living people
1981 births
Egyptian footballers
Zamalek SC players
Association football goalkeepers
Egyptian Premier League players
USL League One coaches
USL League Two coaches
Association football goalkeeping coaches
Lansing Ignite FC
Egyptian expatriate sportspeople in the United States